Dušan "Duško" Lukić (born 7 November 1956) is a former Yugoslav, Bosnian Serb,  football forward from the late 1970s and the 1980s.

Club career
Born in Brčko, SR Bosnia and Herzegovina, back then within Yugoslavia, Lukić played for FK Jedinstvo Brčko, Red Star Belgrade and HNK Rijeka in Yugoslavia and KV Kortrijk in Belgium.

References

1956 births
Living people
People from Brčko District
Serbs of Bosnia and Herzegovina
Association football forwards
Yugoslav footballers
FK Jedinstvo Brčko players
Red Star Belgrade footballers
HNK Rijeka players
K.V. Kortrijk players
Yugoslav First League players
Belgian Pro League players
Yugoslav expatriate footballers
Expatriate footballers in Belgium
Yugoslav expatriate sportspeople in Belgium